Pašalić is a Bosnian and Croatian surname. Notable people with the surname include:

 Arif Pašalić (1943–1998), Bosnian military officer
 Drago Pašalić (born 1984), Croatian basketball player
 Ivić Pašalić (born 1960), Croatian politician
 Marco Pašalić (born 2000), German-born Croatian footballer
 Mario Pašalić (born 1995), Croatian footballer
 Muhamed Pašalić (born 1987), Bosnian basketballer
 Tatjana Pašalić (born 1984), Croatian presenter

Bosnian surnames
Croatian surnames
Slavic-language surnames
Patronymic surnames